Lamidi Olonade Fakeye (1925 – December 25, 2009) was a fifth generation Nigerian sculptor and academic. He was from the Inurin compound of the Isedo Quaters in Ila-Orangun. Professor Lamidi contributed immensely to the growth of sculpture in the whole of the country and even beyond.

Background
Fakeye was born in 1925 in Ila Orangun, Nigeria. He first carved a sculpture in 1938 at that point he was an apprentice to his father. In 1949, he began to be an apprentice with the master sculptor George Bamidele Arowoogun.

Career
In 1955, he went to work at Holy Cross Primary School in Lagos, Nigeria as an art instructor. His first solo exhibition was in 1960 and took place at the British Council in Nigeria. In 1962, he was named the artist-in-residence at Western Michigan University in Kalamazoo, Michigan. By 1964, he was elected president of the Society of Professional Artists of Nigeria, the same year that his exhibit opened at the United States Information Service in Nigeria. In 1971, there was an exhibit that showed three generations of Fakeye woodcarvers in Ibadan, Nigeria. He was appointed to the faculty of University of Ife in 1978. In 1989, he served as the artist-in-residence at a number of universities in cities such as Cleveland and Pittsburgh. He published his autobiography in 1996 and had a retrospective exhibit at Hope College in Holland, Michigan. A retrospective exhibition of his life's work was held at the Smithsonian in 1999 and some of his artwork is being housed by Johfrim Art and Design Studio.

Awards
1989: Awarded Oyo State, Nigeria, Special Merit Award
1999: Appointed Kellogg Visiting Artist for Michigan
2008: Named a UNESCO Living Human Treasure.

Movie
In 2011, a movie was made about Fakeye's life called Lamidi Olonade Fakeye: The Life of a Master Carver directed by Joe Reese and written by Elizabeth Heery.

Death
Fakeye died on December 25, 2009, in Ile-Ife, Nigeria. His death was due to complications following prostate-cancer surgery.

References

External links
 http://www3.wabash.edu/LamidiTheFilm/

1928 births
2009 deaths
20th-century Nigerian sculptors
Yoruba artists
Western Michigan University faculty
Academic staff of Obafemi Awolowo University
Nigerian expatriate academics in the United States
Yoruba academics
People from Osun State
Art educators
Nigerian woodcarvers